The Catholic martyrs of the English Reformation are men and women executed under treason legislation in the English Reformation, between 1534 and 1680, and recognised as martyrs by the Catholic Church. Though consequences of the English Reformation were felt in Ireland and Scotland as well, this article only covers those who died in the Kingdom of England.

On 25 February 1570, Pope Pius V's "Regnans in Excelsis" bull excommunicated the English Queen Elizabeth I, and any who obeyed her. This papal bull also required all Catholics to rebel against the English Crown as a matter of faith. In response, in 1571 legislation was enacted making it treasonable to be under the authority of the pope, including being a Jesuit, being Catholic or harbouring a Catholic priest. The standard penalty for all those convicted of treason at the time was execution by being hanged, drawn and quartered.

In the reign of Pope Gregory XIII (1572–85), authorisation was given for 63 recognised martyrs to have their relics honoured and pictures painted for Catholic devotions. These martyrs were formally beatified by Pope Leo XIII, 54 in 1886 and the remaining nine in 1895. Further groups of martyrs were subsequently documented and proposed by the Catholic bishops of England and Wales and formally recognised by Rome.

Numbers in various categories
In 1874 a process was begun, containing 353 names, to which six were added in Rome, making 359. Of those:
	54 were beatified in 1886, of whom two were canonized in 1935, and 11 in 1970. 
	9 were beatified in 1895.
	One (Oliver Plunkett) was beatified in 1920, and canonized in 1975.
	136 were beatified in 1929, of whom 29 were canonized in 1970
	85 were beatified in 1987.
	(So 285 were beatified at various times, of whom 43 were subsequently canonised).
	30 were declared venerable, of whom one, John Travers, was executed in Dublin and appears in Irish Catholic Martyrs.
       (So 315 were declared venerable, of whom 285 were subsequently beatified).
	44 were postponed ("dilati") – 36 died in prison and 8 were postponed for other reasons.

Canonised by Pope Pius XI on 19 May 1935

 John Fisher, Bishop of Rochester, 22 June 1535 
 Thomas More, layman, 6 July 1535

Canonised by Pope Paul VI on 25 October 1970

 John Almond, priest, 1612
 Edmund Arrowsmith, Jesuit priest, 1628
 Ambrose Edward Barlow, Benedictine priest, 10 September 1641
 John Boste, priest, 24 July 1594
 Alexander Briant, Jesuit priest, 1 December 1581
 Edmund Campion, Jesuit priest, 1 December 1581
 Margaret Clitherow, laywoman, 25 March 1586
 Philip Evans, Jesuit priest, 1679
 Thomas Garnet, Jesuit priest, 1608
 Edmund Gennings, priest, 1591
 John Griffith (alias Jones, Buckley, or Griffith, or Godfrey Maurice), Franciscan friar, 1598
 Richard Gwyn (alias Richard White), layman, 1584
 John Houghton, Prior of the London Charterhouse, 4 May 1535
 Philip Howard, Earl of Arundel, layman, 1595
 John Kemble, priest, 1679
 Luke Kirby, priest, 30 May 1582
 Robert Lawrence, Prior of the Beauvale Charterhouse, 4 May 1535
 David Lewis, Jesuit priest, 1679
 Anne Line, laywoman, 1601
 John Lloyd, priest, 1679
 Cuthbert Mayne, priest, 1577
 Henry Morse, Jesuit priest, 1645
 Nicholas Owen, Jesuit lay-brother, 1606
 John Payne, priest, 1582
 Polydore Plasden, priest, 1591
 John Plessington, priest, 1679
 Richard Reynolds, Brigittine monk of Syon Abbey, 4 May 1535
 John Rigby, layman, 1600
 John Roberts, Benedictine priest, 1610
 Alban Bartholomew Roe, Benedictine priest, 1642
 Ralph Sherwin, priest, 1 December 1581
 John Southworth, priest, 1654
 Robert Southwell, Jesuit priest, 1595
 John Stone, Augustinian friar
 John Wall, Franciscan priest, 1679
 Henry Walpole, Jesuit priest, 1595
 Margaret Ward, laywoman, 1588
 Augustine Webster, Prior of the Axholme Charterhouse, 4 May 1535
 Swithin Wells, layman, 1591
 Eustace White, priest, 1591

Canonised by Pope Paul VI on 12 October 1975
 Oliver Plunkett, Archbishop of Armagh, 1 July 1681 (beatified in 1920).

Beatified 29 December 1886 by Pope Leo XIII
As well as those listed below, John Fisher and Thomas More were beatified on this date, as were 11 members of the Forty Martyrs of England and Wales, making a total of 54.

 Thomas Abel, priest, 30 July 1540
 Richard Bere, Carthusian monk, 9 August 1537
 Thomas Cottam, Jesuit priest, 30 May 1582
 John Davy, Carthusian, 8 June 1537
 William Exmew, Carthusian monk, 19 June 1535
 John Felton, layman, 8 August 1570
 Richard Fetherston, Archdeacon, 30 July 1540
 William Filby, 30 May 1582
 Thomas Ford, 28 May 1582
 John Forest, Franciscan friar, 22 May 1538
 German Gardiner, layman, 7 March 1544
 Thomas Green, Carthusian, 10 June 1537
 William Greenwood, Carthusian brother, 6 June 1537
 John Haile (or Hale), priest, 4 May 1535
 Everard Hanse, priest, 1581
 William Hart, priest, 1583
 William Horne, Carthusian lay brother, 4 August 1540
 Robert Johnson, priest, 1582
 Thomas Johnson, Carthusian, 20 September 1537
 Richard Kirkman, priest, 1582
 William Lacy (or Lacey), priest, 22 August 1582
 John Larke, priest, 7 March 1544
 Humphrey Middlemore, Carthusian monk, 19 June 1535
 John Nelson, priest, 1577
 Sebastian Newdigate, Carthusian monk, 19 June 1535
 Walter Pierson, Carthusian brother, 10 June 1537
 Thomas Plumtree, priest, 1570 – Chaplain to the Rising of the North
 Edward Powell, 30 July 1540
 Thomas Redyng, Carthusian, 16 June 1537
 Lawrence Richardson (also known as Lawrence Johnson), 30 May 1582
 John Rochester, Carthusian monk, 11 May 1537
 Margaret Pole, Countess of Salisbury, laywoman, 27 May 1541
 Robert Salt, Carthusian brother, 9 June 1537
 Thomas Scryven, Carthusian, 15 June 1537
 John Shert, priest, 1582
 Thomas Sherwood, layman, 1579
 John Story, Chancellor to Bishop Bonner, 1571
 Richard Thirkeld, priest, 1583
 James Tompson, priest, York, 1582
 James Walworth, Carthusian monk, 11 May 1537
 Thomas Woodhouse, priest, 1573

(canonized 1935)
 John Fisher
 Thomas More

(canonized 1970)
 Alexander Briant
 Edmund Campion
 John Houghton
 Luke Kirby
 Robert Lawrence
 Cuthbert Mayne
 John Payne
 Richard Reynolds
 Ralph Sherwin
 John Stone
 Augustine Webster

Beatified 13 May 1895 by Pope Leo XIII

 John Beche (or Thomas Marshall), Abbot of Colchester, 1 December 1539
 John Eynon, priest, 14 November 1539
 Hugh Faringdon, Abbot of Reading, 14 November 1539
 Adrian Fortescue, Knight of St. John of Jerusalem, 9 July 1539
 Roger James, Benedictine, 15 November 1539
 Thomas Percy, Earl of Northumberland, layman, 1572 – Leader of the Rising of the North
 John Rugg (or Rugge), Benedictine monk, 15 November 1539
 John Thorne, Benedictine monk, 15 November 1539
 Richard Whiting, Abbot of Glastonbury, 15 November 1539

Beatified 15 December 1929 by Pope Pius XI

As well as those listed below, 29 members of the Forty Martyrs of England and Wales were also beatified on that date, making a total of 136.

This beatification was attended by G.K. Chesterton as detailed in his book “The Resurrection of Rome.”

 Henry Abbot, layman, 4 July 1597
 John Amias, priest, 16 March 1589
 Robert Anderton, priest, 25 April 1586.
 William Andleby, priest, 4 July 1597
 Ralph Ashley, Jesuit priest, 7 April 1607
 Thomas Aufield, priest, 6 July 1585
 Christopher Bales, priest, 4 March 1590
 Mark Barkworth, Benedictine, 27 February 1601
 William Barrow, alias William Harcourt, 20 June 1679 
 James Bell, priest, 1584
 James Bird (or Byrd or Beard), layman, 25 March 1592
 John Bodey, priest, 2 November 1583
 Thomas Bosgrave, layman, 4 July 1594
 William Browne, layman, 5 September 1605
 Christopher Buxton, priest, died Canterbury, 1 October 1588
 Edward Campion (also known as Gerard Edwards), 1 October 1588
 John Carey, Dublin born lay helper of John Cornelius S.J., 4 July 1594
 Edmund Catherick, priest, 1642
 James Claxton (Clarkson), priest, 1588
 Edward Colman (or Coleman), layman, 1678
 Ralph Corbie, Jesuit, 7 September 1644
 John Cornelius, Jesuit priest, 4 July 1594
 Ralph Crockett, priest, 1 October 1588
 Robert Dalby, priest, York, 16 March 1589
 William Dean, priest, 28 August 1588
 Francis Dicconson, priest, 1590
 Roger Dicconson, priest, 7 July 1591
 James Duckett, layman, 1601
 John Duckett, priest, 1644
 Thomas Felton, Franciscan, 1588
 James Fenn, priest, 1584
 John Fenwick, Jesuit priest, 1679
 John Finch, 1584
 William Freeman, priest, 1595
 Edward Fulthrop, layman, 1597
 John Gavan, Jesuit priest, 1679
 Miles Gerard, priest, 1590
 George Gervase, Benedictine, 1608
 David Gonson (or Gunston), Professed Knight in the Order of St John, 12 July 1541
 Hugh Green, priest, 1642 
 John Grove, layman, 24 January 1679
 William Gunter, priest, 1588
 William Harrington, priest, 1594
 William Hartley, priest, 1588
 Thomas Hemerford, priest, 1584
 Richard Herst (Hurst), layman, 29 August 1628 
 John Hewitt (alias Weldon, alias Savell), priest, 1588
 Sydney Hodgson, layman, 10 December 1591
 Thomas Holford, priest, 1588
 Thomas Holland, priest, 12 December 1642
 Laurence Humphreys (or Humphrey), layman, 1591
 John Ingram, priest, 1594
 John Ireland, priest, 7 March 1544
 William Ireland, Jesuit priest, 1679
 Edward James, priest, 1588
 Edward Jones, priest, 1590
 Brian Lacey, layman, 1591
 Richard Langhorne, layman, 1679
 Richard Langley, layman, 1586
 Richard Leigh, priest, 1588
 John Lockwood, priest, 1642
 William Marsden, priest, 25 April 1586
 Richard Martin, layman, 30 August 1588
 John Mason, layman, 1591
 Thomas Maxfield, priest, 1616
 Anthony Middleton, priest, 1590
 Ralph Milner, layman, 7 July 1591
 Hugh More, layman, 28 August 1588
 Robert Morton, priest, 1588
 John Munden, priest, 1584
 George Napper (alias Napier), priest, Oxford, 1610
 John Nutter, priest, 1584
 Edward Oldcorne, Jesuit priest, 1606
 Francis Page, Jesuit, 1602
 William Patenson, priest, 1592
 John Pibush, priest, 1601
 Thomas Pickering, Benedictine, 1679
 Philip Powell, Benedictine, 1646
 Alexander Rawlins, priest, 1595
 Thomas Reynolds, priest, 21 January 1642
 William Richardson, priest, 1603
 John Robinson, priest, 1 October 1588
 John Roche, layman, 1588
 Patrick Salmon, layman, 4 July 1594
 Maurus Scott (William Scot) 1612
 Edward Shelley, 30 August 1588, 
 John Slade, layman, 1583
 Richard Smith, (also known as Richard Newport), priest, 1612
 Thomas Somers, priest, 1610
 John Speed, layman, 4 February 1594
 William Howard, 1st Viscount Stafford, layman, 29 December 1680
 Edward Stransham, priest, 1586
 Robert Sutton, layman, 5 October 1588
 George Swallowell, layman, 26 July 1594
 Thomas Thwing, priest, 1679
 Thomas Tunstall, priest, 1616
 Anthony Turner, Jesuit, 1679
 Thomas Warcop, layman, 4 July 1597
 William Ward, priest, 1641
 Edward Waterson, priest, 1593
 Robert Watkinson, priest, 1602
 William Way (alias May or Flower), priest, 1588
 Thomas Welbourne, layman, 1 August 1605
 Thomas Whitbread, Jesuit, 1679
 Robert Widmerpool, layman, 1 October 1588
 Robert Wilcox, priest, 1 October 1588
 Peter Wright, Jesuit, 1651

(canonized 1970)
 John Almond
 Edmund Arrowsmith
 Ambrose Barlow
 John Boste
 Margaret Clitherow
 Philip Evans
 Thomas Garnet
 Edmund Gennings
 John Griffith
 Richard Gwyn
 Philip Howard, Earl of Arundel
 John Kemble
 David Lewis
 Anne Line
 John Lloyd
 Henry Morse
 Nicholas Owen
 Polydore Plasden
 John Plessington
 John Rigby
 John Roberts
 Alban Roe
 John Southworth
 Robert Southwell
 John Wall
 Henry Walpole
 Margaret Ward
 Swithin Wells
 Eustace White

Beatified 22 November 1987 by Pope John Paul II

 John Adams, priest, 8 October 1586
 Thomas Atkinson, priest, 1616
 Edward Bamber, priest, 1646
 George Beesley, priest, 5 July 1591
 Arthur Bell, Franciscan priest, 1643
 Thomas Belson, layman, 5 July 1589
 Robert Bickerdike, layman, 23 July 1586
 Alexander Blake, layman, 4 March 1590;
 Marmaduke Bowes, layman, 26 November 1585
 John Britton (alias Bretton), layman, 1 April 1598
 Thomas Bullaker, Franciscan priest, 1642
 Edward Burden, priest, 1588
 Roger Cadwallador, priest, 1610
 William Carter, layman, 11 January 1584
 Alexander Crow, priest, 30 November 1587
 William Davies, priest, 27 July 1593
 Robert Dibdale, priest, 8 October 1586
 George Douglas, priest, 1587
 Robert Drury, priest, 1607
 Edmund Duke, priest, 27 May 1590
 George Errington, layman, 1596
 Roger Filcock, priest, 1601
 John Finglow (Fingley), priest, 8 August 1586
 Matthew Flathers, priest, 1608
 Richard Flower, layman, 1588
 Nicholas Garlick, priest, 1588
 William Gibson, layman, 1596
 Ralph Grimston, layman, 1598
 Robert Grissold, layman, 1604
 John Hambley, priest, 1587
 Robert Hardesty, layman, 1589
 George Haydock, priest, 12 February 1584
 Henry Heath, Franciscan priest, 1643
 Richard Hill, priest, 27 May 1590
 John Hogg, priest, 27 May 1590
 Richard Holiday, priest, 27 May 1590
 Nicholas Horner, layman, 4 March 1590
 Thomas Hunt, priest, 1600
 Thurstan Hunt, priest, 1601
 Francis Ingleby, priest, 3 June 1586
 William Knight, layman, 1596
 Joseph Lambton, priest, 24 July 1592
 William Lampley, layman, 1588
 John Lowe, priest, 8 October 1586
 Robert Ludlam, priest, 1588
 Charles Mahoney (alias Meehan), Franciscan priest, 1679
 Robert Middleton, priest, March 1601
 George Nichols, priest, 1589
 John Norton, layman, 1600
 Robert Nutter, priest, 1600
 Edward Osbaldeston, priest, 1594
 Antony Page, priest, 1593
 Thomas Palasor, priest, 1600
 William Pike, layman, 1591
 Thomas Pilchard, priest, 21 March 1587
 Thomas Pormort, priest, 20 February 1592
 Nicholas Postgate, priest, 1679
 Humphrey Pritchard, layman, 1589
 Christopher Robinson, priest, 1597
 Stephen Rowsham, priest, 1587
 John Sandys, priest, 11 August 1586
 Montford Scott, priest, 1591
 Richard Sergeant, priest, 2 April 1586
 Richard Simpson, priest, 1588
 Peter Snow, priest, 1598
 William Southerne, priest, 1618
 William Spenser, priest, 1589
 Thomas Sprott, priest, 1600
 John Sugar, priest, 1604
 Robert Sutton, priest, 1587
 Edmund Sykes, priest, 23 March 1587
 John Talbot, layman, 1600 
 Hugh Taylor, priest, 25 November 1585
 William Thomson, priest, 20 April 1586
 Robert Thorpe, priest, 1591
 John Thulis, priest, 18 Mar 1616
 Edward Thwing, priest, 26 July 1600
 Thomas Watkinson, layman, 31 May 1591
 Henry Webley, 28 August 1588 
 Christopher Wharton, priest, 1600
 Thomas Whitaker, priest, 1646
 John Woodcock, Franciscan priest, 7 August 1646
 Nicholas Woodfen, priest, 21 January 1586
 Roger Wrenno, layman, 1616
 Richard Yaxley, priest, 1589

Declared venerable in 1886 and not subsequently beatified
 Thomas Ashby, layman, 19 March 1544 – "there was some doubt that he died as a Catholic"
 Roger Ashton, soldier, 23 June 1592 – assisted Sir William Stanley in the surrender of Deventer to Spain 
 Laurence Bailey, layman, August 1604 
 Anthony Bates (alias Battie), layman, 22 March 1602
 Thomas Bedingfeld (also known as Thomas Downes), 21 December 1678 (died in prison)
 Thomas Belchiam, Franciscan friar, 3 August 1538:
 Edmund Brindholme, priest, 4 August 1540 
 Anthony Brookby, Franciscan, 7 July 1537:
 Brian Cansfield (or Tansfield), 3 August 1645 (died of ill-treatment in prison)
 Thomas Cort, Franciscan, 27 July 1538:
 Sir Thomas Dingley, layman, 9 July 1539 
 James Dowdall, layman, 13 August 1598 
 John Goodman, priest, 8 April 1642 (died in prison)
 John Griffith (or Clark), priest, 8 July 1539 
 Thomas Hackshott (alias Hawkshaw), layman, 24 August 1601
 James Harrison, priest, 22 March 1602 
 Richard Horner, priest, 4 September 1598 
 Francis Levison, Franciscan, 11 February 1680 (died in prison)
 John Lion, layman, 16 July 1598 
 Edward Mico, Jesuit, 1678 (arrested, but too ill to be removed from sick-bed, where he died)
 Edward Morgan, priest, 26 April 1642
 Francis Nevil, Jesuit, February 1679 (died in prison)
 Clement Philpott (or Philpot), layman, 4 August 1540 
 Robert Price (alias Aprece), layman, shot by Puritan soldiers, 7 May 1644 
 Nicholas Tichborne, layman, 24 August 1601
 Thomas Tichborne, priest, 20 April 1602
 Friar Waire, Franciscan, 8 July 1539
 Thomas Webley, layman, 6 July 1585
 Richard Williams, priest, 21 February 1592

As stated above, John Travers was executed in Dublin and appears in Irish Catholic Martyrs. The total number of those declared venerable in 1886 and not subsequently beatified is therefore 30.

Dilati
They "were left with their fate still in suspense, and are called Dilati. [36 of them were] "Confessors", who certainly died in prison for their faith, though it is not yet proven that they died precisely because of their imprisonment...[the remaining eight – William Tyrrwhit, James Atkinson, Matthias Harrison, Fr. Henry Garnet, S.J., John Mawson, Thomas Dyer, Lawrence Hill and Robert Green] were put off for various causes." Those 'put off' are listed below in italics.
 Robert Dymoke, layman, 1580 (died in prison)
 John Cooper, layman, 1580 (died in prison)
 William Tyrwhit, layman, 1580 (died in prison – named by error for his brother Robert)
 William Chaplin, seminary priest, 1583 (died in prison)
 Thomas Cotesmore, priest, 1584 (died in prison)
 Robert Holmes, priest, 1584 (died in prison)
 Roger Wakeman, priest, 1584 (died in prison)
 James Lomax, priest, 1584 (died in prison)
 Mr Ailworth, layman, 1584 (died in prison)
 Thomas Crowther, priest, 1585 (died in prison)
 Edward Pole, priest, 1585 (died in prison)
 Laurence Vaux, priest, 1585 (died in prison)
 John Jetter, priest, 1585 (died in prison)
 John Harrison, priest, 1586 (died in prison)
 Martin Sherson, priest, 1587 (died in prison)
 Gabriel Thimelby, layman, 1587 (died in prison)
 Thomas Metham, Jesuit, 1592 (died in prison)
 James Atkinson, layman, 1595 ("killed under torture by Topcliffe, but evidence is wanted of his constancy to the end") 
 Matthew/Matthias Harrison, seminary priest, 1599 (not yet sufficiently distinguished from James Harrison)
 Eleanor Hunt, widow, 1600 (died in prison)
 Mrs Swithun Wells, widow, 1602 (died in prison)
 Henry Garnet, Jesuit, executed 1606 ("was he killed ex odio fidei, or was he believed to be guilty of the Powder Plot, by merely human misjudgment, not through religious prejudice?")
 John Mawson, layman, executed 1614 (not yet sufficiently distinguished from John Mason, 1591)
 Thomas Dyer, Benedictine, c.1618–1630 – his identity 'has not been fully proved'"One name among the dilati, that of Thomas Dyer, O.S.B., has also been silently withdrawn, possibly because the year of his martyrdom is uncertain."
 Edward Wilkes, priest, 1642 (died in prison)
 Boniface Kemp, priest, OSB, 1642 (died in prison)
 Ildephonse Hesketh (alias William Hanson), Benedictine, 1642 (died in prison)
 Thomas Vaughan, priest, probably 1644 (died in prison)
 Richard Bradley, Jesuit, 1645 (died in prison)
 John Felton, priest, SJ, 1646 (died in prison)
 Thomas Blount, priest, probably 1646 (died in prison)
 Robert Cox, Benedictine, 1650 (died in prison)
 Laurence Hill, layman, 1679 (Was it due to odium fidei, or an unprejudiced error?)
 Robert Green, layman, 1679 (Was it due to odium fidei, or an unprejudiced error?)
 Thomas Jennison, Jesuit, 1679 (died in prison)
 William Lloyd, seminary priest, 1679 (died in prison)
 Placid Adelham, Benedictine, 1680 (died in prison)
 Richard Birkett, priest, 1680 (died in prison)
 Richard Lacey, Jesuit, 1680 (died in prison)
 William Atkins, Jesuit, 1681 (died in prison)
 Edward Turner, Jesuit, 1681 (died in prison)
 William Allison, priest, 1681 (died in prison)
 Benedict Constable, Benedictine, 1683 (died in prison)
 William Bentney (alias Bennet), Jesuit, 1692 (died in prison)

Executed for their faith in England 1534–1680

1534–1547
During the reign of Henry VIII of England.
 John Allen, priest, 25 February 1538 
 John Collins, priest, 1538 
 George Croft, priest, 1538
 Martin Condres, Augustinian monk, December 1538: 
 Paul of Saint William, Augustinian monk, December 1538:
 Thomas Empson (or Epson), Benedictine, 4 August 1540:
 Robert Bird, layman; 4 August 1540:
 William Bird, priest, 4 August 1540: 
 William Peterson, priest, Commissary of Calais, Calais, 10 August 1540: or 10 April 1540

Decrees of Elizabeth I
During the reign of Mary I, papal authority was officially reinstated and under three hundred of the minority Protestant population were martyred. Upon Elizabeth I's accession to the throne, an Act of Supremacy denied papal authority over the English church; but only a decade later, in February 1570, did Pope Pius V excommunicate Elizabeth and any who obeyed her, issuing the bull Regnans in Excelsis, which purported to "release[ Elizabeth I's] subjects from their allegiance to her".

In the words of the New Catholic Encyclopedia, "Without question it was Elizabeth I's intention to supplant the old religion with the new in a bloodless manner.  It is significant that there were no martyrs in the first 12 years of her reign, and only five in the years 1570 to 1577." Of those five, Thomas Plumtree had been chaplain to the insurgents in the Rising of the North, John Felton had published Pope Pius V's Bull Regnans in Excelsis ("reigning on high"), excommunicating Queen Elizabeth, John Story was tried for high treason, for having supported the Rising of the North and encouraging the Duke of Alba to invade, Thomas Percy, 7th Earl of Northumberland, had led the Rising of the North, and Thomas Woodhouse had declared in a letter to William Cecil that Elizabeth "for her own great disobedience is most justly deposed".

The threat of invasion by a Roman Catholic country assisted by English subjects led the Crown to try to repress Roman Catholicism. Responding to Pius V's action, Elizabeth I's government passed anti-Roman Catholic decrees in 1571 forbidding anyone from maintaining the jurisdiction of the pope by word, deed or act; requiring use of the Book of Common Prayer in all cathedrals, churches and chapels, and forbidding criticism of it; forbidding the publication of any bull, writing or instrument of the Holy See (the death penalty was assigned to this); and prohibiting the importing of Agnus Dei images, crosses, pictures, beads or other things from the Bishop of Rome.

Later laws made illegal the drawing of anyone away from the state church; non-attendance at a Church of England church; raising children with teachers who were not licensed by an Anglican diocesan bishop; and attending or celebrating the Roman Catholic Mass.

In 1585, a new decree made it a crime punishable by death to go overseas to receive the sacrament of Ordination to the Roman Catholic priesthood. Nicholas Devereux (who went by the alias of Nicholas Woodfen) and Edward Barber (see below Edward Stransham) were both put to death in 1586 under this law. William Thomson and Richard Lea (see below Richard Sergeant) were hanged, disembowelled and quartered under the same law. In 1588, eight priests and six laymen at Newgate were condemned and executed under this law.

1570–1603

 William Hambledon, priest, 1585
 John MacMahon, Jesuit priest, 1594

1606–1680
 James Brown, Benedictine, 1645

Died in prison
 Thomas Wood, priest, before 1588

See also
 Elizabeth Barton#Arrest and execution
 Carthusian Martyrs
 Pilgrimage of Grace#Those executed after the Pilgrimage
 Irish Catholic Martyrs
 Marian persecutions

References

Citations

Sources 

 Pendrill, Colin (2000), The English Reformation 1485–1558, Heinemann.
 Pallen, C.B.; Wynne, J.J., eds. (1929), The New Catholic Dictionary, New York: Universal Knowledge Foundation.

External links
 "English Confessors and Martyrs (1534–1729)". article by Pollen, J.H. in The Catholic Encyclopedia (1909)

 List
Catholic martyrs of the English Reformation
Catholic martyrs
Religiously motivated violence in England